is a railway station in the city of Mino, Gifu Prefecture, Japan, operated by the third sector railway operator Nagaragawa Railway.

Lines

Station layout
Umeyama Station has one ground-level side platform serving a single bi-directional track. The station is unattended.

Adjacent stations

|-
!colspan=5|Nagaragawa Railway

History
Umeyama Station was opened on September 21, 1987.

Surrounding area

 Mino Historical Preservation District

See also
 List of Railway Stations in Japan

References

External links

 

Railway stations in Japan opened in 1987
Railway stations in Gifu Prefecture
Stations of Nagaragawa Railway
Mino, Gifu